Detour Nunatak is a broad nunatak between Frazier Glacier and the upper part of Mackay Glacier, in Victoria Land. It was so named in 1957 by the New Zealand Northern Survey Party of the Commonwealth Trans-Antarctic Expedition (1956–58) because it was necessary to make a detour on the way up the Mackay Glacier, passing south of this nunatak.

References 

Nunataks of Victoria Land
Scott Coast